Voorslag (Whiplash) was a literary journal published in Durban, South Africa in 1926 and 1927. It was the first modern small magazine in South Africa and was subtitled "A Magazine of South African Life and Art". The magazine was founded by Roy Campbell and William Plomer; Laurens van der Post was invited to become its Afrikaans correspondent. Campbell served as the publication's editor for three issues before resigning due to interference from his proprietor, Lewis Reynolds; Reynolds discouraged Voorslag'''s criticism of the colonial system.

References

 Peter F. Alexander. William Plomer: A Biography (Oxford Lives, 1991) 
 Andrew Edward Van der Vlies, South African textual cultures: white, black, read all over, Manchester University Press, 2007, 
 Joseph Pearce, Unafraid of Virginia Woolf'' (ISI Books, Wilmington, Delaware: 2004), pp. 81–85

Visual arts magazines
Defunct literary magazines
Defunct magazines published in South Africa
Magazines established in 1926
Magazines disestablished in 1927
Mass media in Durban
Magazines published in South Africa